Bath Street in Bath, Somerset, England was built by Thomas Baldwin in 1791. Several of the buildings have been designated as Grade I listed buildings.

It was originally named Cross Bath Street as it contains the Cross Bath. It is also the entrance to the much more recent Thermae Bath Spa. At the northern end of the street the buildings are continuous with those in Stall Street.

The two-storey buildings have mansard roofs. Windows are pedimented and have decorative friezes. The south side is formed by numbers 1 to 8, while the north side is numbers 9 to 16, which formed part of the Royal Baths Treatment Centre, and are continuous with the buildings in Stall Street.

Bath Street was used for filming in the 1995 period drama film Persuasion.

See also

 List of Grade I listed buildings in Bath and North East Somerset

References

Grade I listed buildings in Bath, Somerset
Streets in Bath, Somerset